Bryan Lugo (born August 7, 1982) is a Dominican-American actor, director. His most recognizable role may be in The CW series Supergirl as Looter. and as Ross the hitman in his recurring role on the Epix series Get Shorty.

Career

Bryan Lugo played Officer Burton in the IFC Films and La Petite Reine film Maniac. The film premiered at the 2012 Cannes Film Festival, out of competition.  Lugo plays opposite Elijah Wood in the film, which premiered to a limited distribution in theaters on January 2, 2013.   His other films include Afternoon Delight, which premiered in the 2013 Sundance Film Festival, opposite Kathryn Hahn, Jane Lynch, and Juno Temple; I Am Gangster (2015); and Marvel Studios' Ant-Man and the Wasp, opposite Tip "T.I." Harris, David Dastmalchian, and Walton Goggins, which premiered on July 6, 2018, worldwide in theaters.

Filmography

References

External links
 
 

1982 births
Living people
American male film actors
American male television actors
20th-century American male actors
21st-century American male actors
Male actors from Los Angeles